This is a list of the 209 ultra prominent peaks, or Ultras in South America.

Guiana Highlands

Sierra Nevada de Santa Marta, Cordillera Oriental, Cordillera de Mérida, and Coastal Range

Cordillera Occidental and Cordillera Central

Cordilleras of Ecuador

Galápagos

Cordillera Blanca and northern Peru

Cordillera Oriental

Cordillera Occidental

Brazilian Highlands

Puna de Atacama to Aconcagua

Mid Argentina and Chile south of Aconcagua

Northern Patagonia

Southern Patagonia

References

Lists - South America
Map - North

Ultras
Ultras